Audrey Roos (1912–1982) was an American writer who, with her husband William Roos, co-authored many mystery novels, short stories, and plays. The wife-husband team, under the pseudonym Kelley Roos, often wrote romantic suspense novels featuring a married pair of sleuths, Jeff and Haila Troy, who lived in New York City. Some of their work appeared under their own names,  Audrey and William Roos, rather than under the pseudonym. In 1956 they wrote Speaking of Murder, a play produced at the Royale Theatre in New York. Their television adaptation of The Burning Court by John Dickson Carr won an Edgar Award from the Mystery Writers of America in 1961.

Bibliography
As Kelley Roos (with William Roos)
 Made up to Kill, 1940; re-published as Made up for Murder (1941)
 If the Shroud Fits, 1941, re-published as Dangerous Blondes (1951)
 The Frightened Stiff (1942)
 Sailor, Take Warning! (1944)
 There Was a Crooked Man (1945)
 Ghost of a Chance (1947)
 Murder in Any Language (1948)
 Triple Threat: Three Jeff and Haila Mysteries (contains She'd Make a Lovely Corpse, Death of a Trouper, and Beauty Marks the Spot) (1949); reprinted as Beauty Marks the Spot (1951)
 The Blonde Died Dancing (1956); re-published as She Died Dancing (1957)
 Requiem for a Blonde (1958); re-published as Murder Noon and Night (1959)
 Scent of Mystery (novelization of screenplay) (1959)
 Necessary Evil (1965)
 Grave Danger (1965)
 Cry in the Night (1966)
 One False Move (1966)
 Who Saw Maggie Brown? (1967)
 To Save His Life (1968)
 Suddenly One Night (1970)
 What Did Hattie See? (1970)
 Bad Trip (1971)
 Murder on Martha's Vineyard (1981)

As Audrey and William Roos (with William Roos)
 Speaking of Murder: A Melodrama; three-act play first produced in 1956 (1957)
 A Few Days in Madrid (1965)
 The Mystery Next Door (1972)
 The Case of the Burning Court, adaptation for television of The Burning Court by John Dickson Carr (1960)

Other
Work by the Rooses appeared in Four and Twenty Bloodhounds (1950), an anthology edited by Anthony Boucher, and in Anthology 1971 (1970), edited by Ellery Queen. They contributed short stories to American Magazine, Mike Shayne Mystery Magazines, Ellery Queen's Mystery Magazine, and other periodicals. The Mugar Memorial Library at Boston University holds a collection of their manuscripts. William Roos, writing under the pen name William Rand, adapted the Ellery Queen novel The Four of Hearts for the stage in 1949, although there is no evidence it was ever performed.

References

1912 births
1982 deaths
20th-century American women writers
Carnegie Mellon University alumni
Writers from New York City
American mystery novelists